Billy Gonzales (born July 18, 1971) is an American football coach and former player who currently serves as wide receivers coach at Florida. He played wide receiver for the Colorado State from 1990 to 1994 before he began his coaching career in late 1994.

Playing career

In 1989, he joined the Colorado State football team. He played for former Ohio State coach Earle Bruce. While he was there, he was mainly a returner, returning 24 punts for 265 yards in 1990 and 16 punts for 330 yards in 1991.

Coaching career

After his playing career, he started his coaching career at small Division-III MacMurray as their wide receivers coach, which he has coached his entire career. He moved on to Kent State in the same role.

He stayed in the Mid-American Conference for his next role at Bowling Green under Urban Meyer, where he met Dan Mullen and John Hevesy, two assistant coaches who Gonzales would coach with many times throughout his career. He moved on to Utah in 2003 with Meyer, Mullen, and Hevesy. He moved with them again to Florida in 2005. After three years as the wide receivers coach, he was promoted to recruiting coordinator in 2008.

He moved on from Florida in 2010 to serve as LSU's passing game coordinator and wide receivers coach under Les Miles. Under his guidance, Rueben Randle had 53 catches for 917 yards in 2011.

In 2012, he became the co-offensive coordinator at Illinois. His offense was an abysmal 122nd out of 124th in total offense, which led to him leaving for Mississippi State, reuniting with Mullen and Hevesy. He was promoted to co-offensive coordinator prior to the 2014. His offense was 17th, 33rd, 56th, and 41st in total offense from 2014–2017. He went with Mullen and Hevesy to Florida in 2018 in the same role.

In 2022, after Florida head coach Dan Mullen was fired, Gonzales joined Willie Taggart's staff at FAU as a wide receivers coach.

References

1971 births
Living people
People from Thornton, Colorado
Sportspeople from Colorado
Players of American football from Colorado
American football wide receivers
Colorado State Rams football players
MacMurray Highlanders football coaches
Kent State Golden Flashes football coaches
Bowling Green Falcons football coaches
Utah Utes football coaches
Florida Gators football coaches
LSU Tigers football coaches
Illinois Fighting Illini football coaches
Mississippi State Bulldogs football coaches